Amphetamine type stimulants (ATS) are a group of synthetic drugs that are chemical derivatives of the parent compound alpha-methylphenethylamine, also known as amphetamine. Common ATS includes amphetamine, methamphetamine, ephedrine, pseudoephedrine, 3,4-methylenedioxymethamphetamine (MDMA), 3,4-methylenedioxyamphetamine (MDA) and 3,4-methylenedioxyethylamphetamine (MDEA). ATS when used illicitly has street names including ice, meth, crystal, crank, bennies, and speed. Within the group of amphetamine-type stimulants, there are also prescription drugs including mixed amphetamine salts, dextroamphetamine, and lisdexamfetamine.

Amphetamine was first synthesized in 1887 by the Romanian chemist Lazar Edeleano. It has since been used to treat a range of disorders from asthma to ADHD and illicitly for recreational purposes. Amphetamine-type stimulants contain chemical groups including unsubstituted phenyl ring, a methyl group at the alpha-position, and primary amino group, which accounts for its psychostimulant activities. ATS with multiple substitutions on the phenyl ring has a hallucinogenic effect on top of the psychostimulant effect, and are categorised as the ecstasy-class drugs.

Amphetamine-type stimulants in general are sympathomimetic amine that stimulates the central nervous system, also proven to cause insomnia, arousal, and reduced hunger. Due to its physiological and psychological effects, ATS has been used to suppress appetite, improve cognitive performance, as well as treating ADHD, depression, and narcolepsy. Amphetamine type stimulants are also known for their addictive property and widespread problem of substance abuse. The adverse effects of ATS, especially when chronically used, include obsessive–compulsive tendencies, anxiety, paranoia, hallucinations, aggression, mania and in extreme cases, amphetamine psychosis.

History 


Amphetamine, the parent compound of amphetamine-type stimulants was first synthesized by Romanian chemists Lazar Edeleano in 1887. Around the same time, amphetamine's precursor ephedrine was also abstracted from a Chinese herbal medicine ephedra by a Japanese Chemist. After its discovery, amphetamine was purified and put into medical use in the 1900s. Amphetamine was originally sold as a decongestant inhaler in the United States in 1933 and led to widespread ATS abuse in military forces and civilians later on.

The details of history of amphetamine can be found here.

Chemistry 
Ephedrine is the precursor of synthetic amphetamines. The diastereomer of ephedrine, pseudoephedrine is found in Ephedra sinica together along with ephedrine. Ephedrine and pseudoephedrine are both generally used for weight reduction and performance enhancement. They are also precursors of methamphetamine synthesis.

The activity of amphetamine-type stimulants depends on their unsubstituted phenyl ring, alphy methyl group, primary amino group and two-carbon side-chain that connects the primary amino group and the phenyl ring.

Hallucinogenic activity of ATS are often caused by multiple substitutions on the phenyl ring, examples include 4-bromo-2,5-dimethoxyamphetamine and 2,5-dimethoxy-4-methylamphetamine. When the methoxy group is substituted in the para position of the ATS molecule, the hallucinogenic potency will become significantly high.

Pharmacology 
Amphetamine type stimulants can be subdivided based on their activity on the central nervous system, compounds with hallucinogenic properties are the MDMA-related compounds. All ATS acts as psychostimulants, which produce stimulatory effects and leads to hyperarousal and increased movement. While MDMA-related compounds possess a structure similar to mescaline and has hallucinogenic properties on top of psychostimulant properties.

ATS facilitates monoamine neurotransmission by blocking membrane monoamine transporters, which results in inhibited clearance of monoamine. Examples of monoamine transporters include dopamine transporters, norepinephrine transporters and serotonin transporters.

ATS are also competitive antagonists that compete with the monoamine neurotransmitters due to their similar structures. ATS then enter the presynaptic neuron and inhibit the vesicular monoamine transporter 2 (VMAT2) to reduce the reuptake of monoamine neurotransmitters.

ATS inhibits monoamine oxidase and hence inhibits monoamine degradation and some of them may have interaction with presynaptic intracellular receptors that promote monoamine neurotransmission. For instance, methamphetamine acts as an agonist of sigma-1 receptor.

Pharmacodynamics 
ATS use disorders are related to the GABA system. Research shows that ATS use would affect normal function of the GABAA receptors. Clonazepam, which is a GABAA receptor agonist, is shown to prevent the acquisition of behavioural sensitization to methamphetamine. GABAA receptor antagonist is shown to aggravate ATS use disorders. Hence, a possible mechanism could be that activating GABAA receptor reduces dopaminergic neurotransmission and GABAA receptors may have an inhibitory role in ATS-induced disorders.

ATS also inhibit GABAB receptors, glutamic acid decarboxylase (GAD), GABA transporters (GAT) and promote GABA metabolism. This leads to the reduced expression of extracellular GABA expression, inhibited biosynthesis of GABA-nergic neurotransmitter and depressed function of GABAB receptors-GIRK channels.

Pharmacokinetics 
ATS can be administered via oral (swallowing), intranasal (inhaling vapour or snorting), and intravenous routes. Taking ATS orally is the most common route of administration. The response time and other pharmacokinetics profile of ATS varies for different routes of administration. 

ATS are metabolised by liver enzymes especially cytochrome P450 2D6, producing metabolites including 4-hydroxyamphetamine, 4 hydroxynorephedrine, hippuric acid, benzoic acid and benzyl methyl ketone. The metabolism of ATS may vary from person to person due to genetic polymorphism of the enzyme CYP450 2D6. Under normal conditions, around 5 to 30% of amphetamine is excreted unchanged in the urine. However, the urinary excretion of amphetamine and other ATS is highly dependent on the pH. A small amount of amphetamine is also produced from metabolism of methamphetamine, but does not cause any significant clinical effect.

Uses

Treatment of Attention Deficit Hyperactivity Disorder 
Dextroamphetamine and Lisdexamfetamine are widely used for Attention Deficit Hyperactivity Disorder (ADHD). These two drugs are first-line drugs for children, adolescents and adults.

Antidepressant
Amphetamine has been used in the past to treat anhedonia, a major phenomenon of depression. The use of ATS as an antidepressant was no longer common after the production of the more effective tricyclic antidepressants and monoamine oxidase inhibitors (MAOI). ATS were established as a detriment to public health.

Appetite suppressant
A study conducted by the pharmaceutical company Smith, Kline & French (SKF) in 1947 showed that amphetamine can affect the brain center for appetite and help to reduce weight. In the late 1960s, weight reduction was the most common indication for ATS. Nowadays, to suppress appetite, phentermine is still used.

Treatment for narcolepsy 
Amphetamine type stimulants can be used in the treatment of narcolepsy, a rare neurological disorder where the brain is unable to regulate the sleep-wake mechanism. Amphetamines causes an increase in dopamine release, which is the proposed mechanism for its wake-promoting effect. ATS such as dextroamphetamine are used in the treatment of narcolepsy when another CNS stimulant, modafinil is not effective.

Cognitive performance 
Early users of amphetamine-type stimulants may report that their cognitive performance and working abilities are improved . Low-to-moderate doses of ATS improves psychomotor output without significantly affecting memory, verbal task performance and intelligence measures. ATS may boost the school performance of some students through emotional mechanisms that increase their confidence. However, amphetamine-type stimulants is not prescribed for this use legally.

Abuse 
Amphetamine is frequently used for pleasure and abused because of the addictive properties. The definition of ATS abuse is a maladaptive pattern of substance use manifested by recurrent and significant adverse consequences related to the repeated use of substances. While dependence refers to the use of amphetamine 'accompanied by evidence of tolerance, withdrawal, or compulsive behaviour". Abuse of ATS is a threat to global public health. The United Nations World Drug Report states that about 0.3-1.3% of the global population has ATS abuse problems, where methamphetamine accounts for 71% of global ATS seizures.

Adverse effects 
The adverse effect of ATS may be caused by many factors, including overdose of prescribed drugs, or use of illicit substance that are not safe in any pharmacological relevant dose. ATS-related fatality and toxicity usually arises from abuse of ATS, rather than adverse drug reactions. ATS may lead to serious health issues with dose-dependent severity.

Psychosis 
Substantial evidence shows that psychotic patients, especially patients with schizophrenia, are more likely to engage in ATS abuse. ATS abuse inhibits dopamine transporter (DAT) and increases dopamine level in the synaptic cleft. The extent of DAT inhibition is associated with the symptoms. Amphetamine-type stimulants-induced psychosis has been reported ever since 1938. Symptoms mainly include delusions and hallucinations. Different kinds of hallucinations are also seen, like auditory, visual, olfactory and tactile hallucinations. Less common symptoms are bizarre behaviour and thought disorder. Though some believed that the ATS-induced psychosis cannot be distinguished from schizophrenia, delusions of persecution are often reported as a characteristic of ATS-induced psychosis.

The duration of ATS-induced psychosis has substantial variations, from weeks to months. Based on their durations, psychosis can be divided into two types. One type has a shorter psychotic state that shows improvement as the central action of ATS changes. The other type has a longer duration.

Toxicity 
The toxic dose of ATS varies between person due to development of drug tolerance and genetic polymorphism of the CYP450 2D6 gene. Different ATS also have different toxic dose. Methamphetamine fatality from ATS have been reported after ingestion of a minimal dose of 1.3 mg/kg, while the estimated minimum lethal dose in a non-addicted adult is 200 mg. Generally, children are more likely to develop toxicity and have lower chances of developing tolerance.

Treatment 
Studies suggest treatment of ATS-induced psychosis by risperidone and olanzapine. While some suggest the usage of low-dose antipsychotic medications to alleviate the symptoms by preventing sensitisation.

Studies show that antidepressants like fluoxetine, imipramine and desipramine have very limited effects for ATS abuse since they may reduce craving or increase period of adherence to short-to-medium-term treatments.

A variety of psychosocial interventions have been shown to be effective in reducing substance abuse and risk behaviours associated with ATS. There is a strong recommendation that intensive psychosocial interventions be implemented, developed, and adapted to the social context in which they are implemented

References 

 
Designer drugs